Gracilosia is a genus of moths of the Momphidae family. It contains only one species, Gracilosia ochreopennella, which is found in Tajikistan.

References

Momphidae